Friedman, Friedmann, and Freedman are surnames of German origin, and from the 17th century were also adopted by Ashkenazi Jews. It is the 9th most common surname in Israel (8th among Jews) and most common exclusively Ashkenazi name.

They may refer to:

Artists
Adam Friedman, American singer
Arnold Friedman (1879–1946), American painter
Barnett Freedman (1901–1958), British painter and graphic artist
Drew Friedman (cartoonist) 
Harold Freedman (1915–1999), artist public murals
Jill Freedman (1939–2019), American photographer
Ken Friedman (born 1949), seminal figure in Fluxus
Tom Friedman (artist) (born 1965), American sculptor

Businesspeople
Ann Freedman, American art dealer
Eugene Freedman (1925–2008), entrepreneur and philanthropist
George Friedman (born 1949), founder of Stratfor
Richard L. Friedman (born 1940), prominent businessman and real estate developer
Stephen Friedman (PFIAB) (born 1937), former chairman and CEO of Goldman Sachs

Economists, lawyers and politicians
Benjamin M. Friedman (born 1944), American political economist
Bernát Friedmann (1843–1925), Hungarian jurist and criminal lawyer
Bernie Friedman, attorney in Hollywood, Florida
Daniel Friedmann (born 1936), Israeli law professor and former Minister of Justice
David D. Friedman (born 1945), American economist, physicist, legal scholar, and libertarian theorist, son of Milton Friedman
David M. Friedman (born 1958), American bankruptcy lawyer and United States Ambassador to Israel
Don Friedman (Colorado politician) (1930–2013), American politician
J. Isaac Friedman (1877–1949), American politician
James Friedman, Professor of Law Emeritus at the University of Maine School of Law
Jerome B. Friedman (born 1943), American judge
Lawrence M. Friedman (born 1930), American law professor
Lee M. Friedman (1871–1957), American lawyer and historian
 Leon Friedman (politician) (1886 – 1948), American politician
 Leon Friedman (legal scholar) (born 1933), American legal scholar
Louis L. Friedman (1906–1997), New York politician and judge
Martin Freedman, Canadian lawyer
Michel Friedman (born 1956), German former lawyer
Milton Friedman (1912–2006), Nobel Memorial Prize-winning economist
Patri Friedman (born 1976), American libertarian activist and theorist of political economy, grandson of Milton Friedman
Rose Friedman (1910–2009), economist and law professor, wife of Milton Friedman
Samuel Freedman (1903–1993), lawyer, judge, and Chief Justice of the Province of Manitoba
Stephen J. Friedman (born 1938), dean of Pace University School of Law
Sylvan Friedman (1908–1979), American politician

Musicians
Avraham Fried, Jewish composer and musical entertainer, also known as Avraham Friedman
Benny Friedman (born 1985), American Hasidic Jewish singer
Dean Friedman (born 1955), singer-songwriter
Debbie Friedman (1951–2011), musician 
Don Friedman (1935–2016), jazz pianist
Eric Friedman, American musician and songwriter
Erick Friedman (1939–2004), violinist
Gary William Friedman, composer 
Harry Freedman (1922–2005), Canadian composer, musician and educator
Ignaz Friedman (1882–1948), Polish-Austrian pianist, composer, also known as Ignacy Friedman
Kinky Friedman (born 1944), singer and candidate for the Texas gubernatorial election, 2006
Marc Friedman (born 1977), electric bassist/multi-instrumentalist and composer
Marty Friedman (born 1962), guitarist
Matthew Friedman (musician), musician, singer and performer
Michael Friedman (1975–2017), composer and lyricist
Ross the Boss Friedman (born 1954), guitarist 
Tim Freedman (born 1964), Australian musician

Philosophers
Egon Friedell (1878–1938), Austrian philosopher, also known as Egon Friedmann
Hermann Friedmann (1873–1957), Polish-German philosopher and jurist

Photographers
Glen E. Friedman (born 1962), photographer
Robert Capa (1913–1954), 20th century war photographer, also known as Endré Ernő Friedmann

In religion
Alexander Zusia Friedman (1897–1943), Polish rabbi, educator, activist and journalist
Avrohom Yaakov Friedman (first Sadigura rebbe) (1820–1883) 
Avrohom Yaakov Friedman (third Sadigura rebbe) (1884–1964)
Avrohom Yaakov Friedman (fifth Sadigura rebbe) (1928–2013)
David Noel Freedman (1922–2008), biblical scholar
Denes Friedmann (1903–1944), Hungarian writer and Chief Rabbi in Újpest
Edwin Friedman (1932–1996), applied family systems theory to congregational leadership
Israel Friedman of Ruzhyn (1796–1850), founder of the Hasidic dynasty of Ruzhin
Manis Friedman (born 1946), biblical scholar, author, counselor and speaker
Meïr ben Jeremiah Friedmann (1831–1908), Hungarian-Austrian scholar, Jewish theologian 
Mordechai Shlomo Friedman (1891–1971), Boyaner Rebbe of New York
Richard Elliott Friedman (born 1946), scholar of biblical criticism
Yisrael Friedman (1923–2017), Pashkaner Rebbe 
Yitzchok Friedman (1850–1917), first Rebbe of Boyan

Scientists and mathematicians
Alexander Friedman (1888–1925), mathematician and cosmologist
Avner Friedman (born 1932), mathematician
Daniel P. Friedman (born 1944), computer scientist and mathematician
Elizebeth Smith Friedman (1892–1980), US Army cryptographer
Harold Friedman (1923–2005), US physical chemist
Harry Friedmann (1931–2018), Israeli chemist
Harvey Friedman (born 1948), mathematical logician
Herbert Friedman (1916–2000), American rocket scientist, solar physicist, aeronomist, and astronomist
Herbert Friedmann (1900–1987), American ornithologist
Irving Friedman (1920–2005), geochemist
Jerome H. Friedman (born 1939), American statistician
Jerome Isaac Friedman (born 1930), physicist
Joyce Friedman (1928–2018), American mathematician, operations researcher, computer scientist, and computational linguist
Louis Friedman (born 1941), American astronautics engineer
Maurice Friedman (1903–1991), reproductive-physiology researcher
Meyer Friedman (1910–2001), medical scientist
Michael Freedman (born 1951), mathematician at Microsoft Research
Nat Friedman (born 1977), programmer
Richard A. Friedman, psychiatrist and professor
Samuel O. Freedman (born 1928), clinical immunologist, professor 
Stanton T. Friedman (1934–2019), physicist and ufologist
Stuart Freedman (1944–2012), physicist
Sy Friedman (born 1953), logician
William F. Friedman (1891–1969), US Army cryptographer

Academic scholars
Carl Freedman (born 1951), American writer and academic
Eric Freedman (journalist), American journalist and professor at Michigan State University
 Eric M. Freedman, American legal scholar and professor at Hofstra University
Georges Friedmann (1902–1977), French sociologist
James O. Freedman (1935–2006), fifteenth president of Dartmouth College
Jeffrey Friedman (political scientist), (born 1959)
Paul Freedman, historian
Renée Friedman, American Egyptologist
Tuviah Friedman (1922–2011), director of the Institute for the Documentation of Nazi War Crimes in Haifa
Walter A. Friedman, American academic
Yohanan Friedmann (born 1936), Israeli scholar of Islamic studies

Sportspeople
Adar Friedmann (born 2006), Israeli rhythmic gymnast 
Andrew Friedman (born 1976), American, became baseball General Manager of the Tampa Bay Rays at age 28
Benny Friedman (1905–1982), American Hall of Fame NFL football quarterback
Birgit Friedmann (born 1960), German runner and 1980 world champion
Clara Friedman (1920–2015), Israeli chess master
Dougie Freedman (born 1974), Scottish association football manager
Gal Fridman (born 1975), Israeli windsurfer and Olympic gold medalist
Lee Freedman (born 1956), Australian racehorse trainer
Lennie Friedman (born 1976), American NFL football player for the Cleveland Browns
Limor Friedman (born 1968), Israeli Olympic gymnast
Mark Friedman (born 1995), Canadian National Hockey League player
Marty Friedman (basketball) (1889–1986), Hall of Fame NBA pro basketball player and coach
Maxwell Jacob Friedman (born 1996), American professional wrestler
Nicole Freedman (born 1972), American Olympic cyclist
Ross Friedman (soccer) (born 1992), American Major League Soccer player
Ze'ev Friedman (1944–1972), Israeli Olympic weightlifter and victim of the Munich massacre
Dennis Freedman (born 1974), Australian Stand-up comedian and part-time cricket journalist

In television and film
Albert Freedman (1922-2017), American television producer
Budd Friedman (1932–2022), American actor and producer
David F. Friedman (1923–2011), American filmmaker and producer
Josh Friedman (born 1967), American screenwriter
Maria Friedman (born 1961), musical theatre actress
Mike Freedman, American pioneering cameraman
Tal Friedman (born 1963), Israeli actor and comedian
Vivi Friedman (1967–2012), Finnish filmmaker

Writers
Bruce Jay Friedman (1930–2020), novelist, screenwriter and playwright
Celia S. Friedman (born 1957), science fiction novelist
David Freedman (1898–1936), playwright and biographer
David Friedman, a.k.a. Dafydd ab Hugh (born 1960), writer
Esther Pauline Friedman (1918–2002), advice columnist also known as Ann Landers
Frieda Friedman, author 
Hannah Friedman, writer, director and musician
Jacques Frémontier (born surname Friedman; 1930–2020), French journalist and television producer
David Gerrold (born 1944), science fiction author, also known as Jerrold David Friedman
Mia Freedman (born 1971), former Editor of Australian Cosmopolitan magazine and blogger
Michael Jan Friedman (born 1955), author 
Norman Friedman, Ph.D., (born 1946), is an American internationally known author and analyst, strategist, and historian
Rita Friedman, creator of The Letter People
Samuel G. Freedman (born 1955), journalist
Thomas Friedman (born 1953), columnist

Other
Benjamin H. Freedman (1890–1984), American businessman, Holocaust denier and anti-Zionist
Elizebeth Friedman (1892–1980), cryptanalyst and author
Friedrich Franz Friedmann, tuberculosis charlatan
Henryk Friedman (1903–1942), Polish chess master
Hoshea Friedman, brigadier general in the IDF
Joseph Friedman (1900–1982), inventor
Judith Freedman, British solicitor and academic
Ken Friedman (restaurateur)
Maurice J. Freedman, (born 1939), librarian
Morris Friedman, private stenographer
 Prahlad Friedman (born 1978), professional poker player

Fictional characters
Luke Friedman, a character in the Netflix series  Grand Army
Sally J. Freedman, protagonist in Judy Blume novel Starring Sally J. Freedman as herself
Sidney Freedman, psychiatrist in the television series M*A*S*H

See also

Friedemann, a German name
Freedman, a former slave
Fried (surname)
Fridman

References

German-language surnames
Jewish surnames
Yiddish words and phrases
Yiddish-language surnames